List of champions of the 1889 U.S. National Championships tennis event (now known as the US Open). The men's tournament was held from 27 August to 3 September on the outdoor grass courts at the Newport Casino in Newport, Rhode Island. The women's tournament was held from 11 June to 15 June on the outdoor grass courts at the Philadelphia Cricket Club in Philadelphia, Pennsylvania. The men's doubles event was played at the Staten Island Cricket Club in Livingston, Staten Island, New York. It was the 9th U.S. National Championships and the second Grand Slam tournament of the year. The inaugural U.S. Women's National Doubles Championship was held in 1889 and like the women's singles was played at the Philadelphia Cricket Club.:

Finals

Men's singles

 Henry Slocum defeated  Quincy Shaw  6–3, 6–1, 4–6, 6–2

Women's singles

 Bertha Townsend defeated  Lida Voorhees  7–5, 6–2

Men's doubles

 Henry Slocum /  Howard Taylor defeated  Valentine Hall /  Oliver Campbell 6–1, 6–3, 6–2

Women's doubles
 Margarette Ballard /  Bertha Townsend defeated  Marion Wright /  Laura Knight 6–0, 6–2

References

External links
Official US Open website

 
U.S. National Championships
U.S. National Championships (tennis) by year
U.S. National Championships (tennis)
U.S. National Championships (tennis)
U.S. National Championships (tennis)
U.S. National Championships (tennis)
U.S. National Championships (tennis)